Harry Beckett (10 June 1839 - 24 October 1880) was a comedian who was president of The Lambs from 1879 to 1880.

Biography
He was born on 10 June 1839 in London. His father died at an early age, and he was raised by his mother. He was trained as a violinist. He was president of The Lambs from 1879 to 1880. He died on 24 October 1880.

External links

References

1839 births
1880 deaths
The Lambs presidents
Comedians from London